RCAC may refer to:
 Royal Canadian Armoured Corps
 Royal Canadian Air Cadets
 Royal Canadian Army Cadets
 Recreational Canoe Association of Canada